Bohol may refer to:

Places

Philippines
Bohol, an island province
Bohol Sea

Somaliland
Bohol, Somaliland

People
 Rolando Bohol, Filipino boxer